The Medal "For the Victory over Japan" () was a medal of the Mongolian People's Republic was established by the decree of the Presidium of the Little Khural on November 20, 1945 to commemorate the victory in the Soviet–Japanese Conflict of the Second World War.

Recipients

Mongolian 
 Khorloogiin Choibalsan
 Yumjaagiin Tsedenbal

Soviet 
Joseph Stalin
Kliment Voroshilov
Mikhail Belov
Kirill Meretskov
Leon Orbeli
Georgy Zhukov
Aleksandr Vasilevsky
Nikolai Dedaev

References

Literature 

 Herfurth D. Sowjetische Auszeichnungen 1918—1991. Auszeichnungen der Mongolische Volksrepublik. 1924—1992. Ein Katalog. Germany. 1999.
 Викторов-Орлов И. В. Награды Монгольской Народной Республики. Определитель. Горький: РИО Горьковского областного клуба экслибрисистов, 1990.
 Шейн Р., Содномдаржа Ц. Государственные награды Монгольской Народной Республики. 1921—1983 гг. Справочник. Улан-Батор: Госиздат МНР, 1984.
Orders, decorations, and medals of Mongolia
Awards established in 1945
Military awards and decorations of World War II